This is the list of cathedrals in the Republic of the Congo sorted by denomination.

Roman Catholic
Cathedrals of the Roman Catholic Church in the Republic of the Congo:
Cathedral of the Sacred Heart in Brazzaville
Cathédrale Notre-Dame in Impfondo
Cathedral of St. Louis in Nkayi
Cathedral of St. Peter Claver in Ouesso
Cathédrale Saint-Firmin in Owando
Cathedral of St. Peter the Apostle in Pointe-Noire

See also

List of cathedrals
Religion in the Republic of the Congo

References

 
Congo, Republic of the
Cathedrals
Cathedrals